Syagrus picrophylla is a species of flowering plant in the family Arecaceae. It is found only in Brazil.

References

picrophylla
Flora of Brazil
Least concern plants
Taxonomy articles created by Polbot